John E. Lange (born 1948) was the "United States Avian Influenza and Pandemic Ambassador".

Education
In 1975 he graduated cum laude from the University of Wisconsin Law School and was admitted to the bar in Wisconsin (and to the New York bar in 1979). He is a "distinguished graduate" of the National War College of National Defense University (1996).

State Department
Ambassador John E. Lange retired from the Foreign Service in February 2009. Prior to retirement, John served in the U.S. Department of State as the Special Representative on Avian and Pandemic Influenza, Deputy Inspector General, Deputy Global AIDS Coordinator, and Associate Dean for Leadership and Management at the Foreign Service Institute. Earlier, he served as U.S. Ambassador to Botswana. As Chargé d'Affaires, he led the American Embassy in Dar es Salaam at the time of the terrorist bombing on August 7, 1998. He worked for the Global Health Program of the Bill & Melinda Gates Foundation from 2009 to 2013. He began work at the United Nations Foundation in 2013.  He and his wife have one daughter, who grew up in Togo, Switzerland, Tanzania, Botswana, and Northern Virginia and who received the FSYF's Una Chapman Cox Award for Domestic Community Service in 2005.

United Nations Foundation

Ambassador John E. Lange (Ret.) serves as the United Nations Foundation’s Senior Fellow for Global Health Diplomacy and as the primary focal point for the UN Foundation's global health diplomacy activities. A pioneer in the field of global health diplomacy and a leader in pandemic preparedness and response, he has held leadership positions in the Global Polio Eradication Initiative and the Measles & Rubella Initiative.

References

Further reading
 Pandemic Flu: Towards an Effective Global Preparedness Policy by Amb. John E. Lange, Special Representative on Avian and Pandemic Influenza at Chatham House, London, United Kingdom on October 17, 2007

External links
 

|-

1948 births
Ambassadors of the United States to Botswana
Avian influenza
Chatham House people
Influenza pandemics
Living people
United States Foreign Service personnel
University of Wisconsin Law School alumni